UFC 141: Lesnar vs. Overeem was a mixed martial arts pay-per-view event held by the Ultimate Fighting Championship on Friday December 30, 2011, at the MGM Grand Garden Arena in Las Vegas, Nevada.

Background
The UFC returned to a 10 p.m. ET start with this event.

UFC 141 was the last event to feature preliminary fights live on Spike TV.

This event marked Brock Lesnar's return to MMA action after being out for over a year due to diverticulitis.  The lead up to the fight was rife with controversy regarding his opponent, Alistair Overeem.  In November 2011, both competitors were required by the NSAC to comply with out-of-competition drug testing.  Lesnar delivered his sample screen on November 21, while Overeem delivered his on November 23.  The screen, however, did not meet the standards of the commission.  Overeem submitted a second test through his personal physician – which was also deemed unacceptable – before flying out of the country.  Overeem was ultimately given a conditional license for the fight by the committee during a meeting held on December 12, 2011.

The winner of the main event was expected to face Junior dos Santos in a bout for the UFC Heavyweight Championship. After being defeated by Overeem, Lesnar announced his immediate retirement from the UFC.

T. J. Grant was originally scheduled to face Jacob Volkmann at this event but was forced to pull out due to an undisclosed injury, and was replaced by returning veteran Efrain Escudero.

Matthew Riddle was scheduled to face Luis Ramos, but the bout was cancelled only moments before the fight due to Riddle being ill.

Ramsey Nijem was scheduled to face Anthony Njokuani at the event but was forced to pull out due to an undisclosed injury, and replaced by Danny Castillo.

Results

Bonus awards
Fighters were awarded $75,000 bonuses.

Fight of the Night:  Nate Diaz vs.  Donald Cerrone
Knockout of the Night:  Johny Hendricks
Submission of the Night: Not awarded as no matches ended by submission.

Reported payout
The following is the reported payout to the fighters as reported to the Nevada State Athletic Commission. It does not include sponsor money and also does not include the UFC's traditional "fight night" bonuses.

Alistair Overeem: $380,000 (includes $190,000 win bonus) def. Brock Lesnar: $400,000
Nate Diaz: $74,000 (includes $37,000 win bonus) def. Donald Cerrone: $30,000
Johny Hendricks: $52,000 (includes $26,000 win bonus) def. Jon Fitch: $60,000
Alexander Gustafsson: $32,000 (includes $16,000 win bonus) def. Vladimir Matyushenko: $40,000
Jim Hettes: $16,000 (includes $8,000 win bonus) def. Nam Phan: $8,000
Ross Pearson: $40,000 (includes $20,000 win bonus) def. Junior Assuncao: $8,000
Danny Castillo: $38,000 (includes $19,000 win bonus) def. Anthony Njokuani: $12,000
Dong Hyun Kim: $82,000 (includes $41,000 win bonus) def. Sean Pierson: $8,000
Jacob Volkmann: $32,000 (includes $16,000 win bonus) def. Efrain Escudero: $10,000
Diego Nunes: $24,000 (includes $12,000 win bonus) def. Manny Gamburyan: $18,000

References

Ultimate Fighting Championship events
2011 in mixed martial arts
Mixed martial arts in Las Vegas
2011 in sports in Nevada
MGM Grand Garden Arena